Gudamakeri is a village in Belgaum district in the southern state of Karnataka, India. Chikkodi taluka is the largest with an area of 1,995.70 km and Raybag taluka is the smallest with an area of 958.8 km. The district comprises three revenue sub-divisions and six police sub-divisions. Apart from the Belgaum City Corporation, there are 17 municipalities, 20 towns, 485 gram panchayats, 1,138 inhabited villages and 26 non-inhabited villages. Belgaum is also the headquarters of the Belgaum Revenue Division.

References

Villages in Belagavi district